Jyrgalbek Kalmamatov (22 December 1972 – 2 January 2018) was a Kyrgyz politician and member of the Kyrgyzstan Party. He was born on December 22, 1972 in the village of Gulcho Osh Oblast. In 1993, he graduated from the Kyrgyz financial and economic school. He was elected to the Supreme Council in 2015, he died in office on 2 January 2018 of a heart attack at the age of 45. Kalmamatov had a wife and nine children.

References

1972 births
2018 deaths
Members of the Supreme Council (Kyrgyzstan)
People from Osh Region